Hay Lake is an unorganized territory in Saint Louis County, Minnesota, United States. The population was 98 at the 2000 census.

Nearby places include Biwabik Township, the city of Biwabik, and Pike Township.

Geography
According to the United States Census Bureau, the unorganized territory has a total area of 30.0 square miles (77.8 km2), of which 29.8 square miles (77.2 km2) is land and 0.2 square mile (0.6 km2) (0.77%) is water.

Demographics
At the 2010 census, 83 people lived in the territory (down from the figure of 98 recorded in 2000) in 38 households and 29 families. The racial makeup of the unorganized territory was 100.00% White.

References

External links 

 Aquatic vegetation of Lower Hay Lake, August 2011, Minnesota Department of Natural Resources
Upper Hay Lake, 2011 RMB Environmental Laboratories Inc.
Lower Hay Lake, 2011, RMB Environmental Laboratories Inc.

Populated places in St. Louis County, Minnesota
Unorganized territories in Minnesota